The 1908 circuito di Bologna was a Grand Prix car race. This race inspired Enzo Ferrari to become a racing driver.

References

Rally competitions in Italy
Circuito di Bologna
Circuito di Bologna